Haaga-Helia University of Applied Sciences is one of Finland's largest universities of applied sciences ("ammattikorkeakoulu" in Finnish). The institution is fully supervised and accredited by the Finnish government through the Ministry of Education and Culture. The university's primary facilities are in Pasila, Helsinki. It has other premises in Haaga, Malmi (all in Helsinki), and in Porvoo and Vierumäki.

Haaga-Helia offers Bachelor and Master level courses in business, information technology, sport and leisure education, hospitality, tourism and event management, journalism, and vocational teacher education. It has about 11,000 students, of whom 1,000 are international students, and about 650 employees, of whom nearly 400 are full-time teachers. In the field of business, Haaga-Helia is the largest educator in the Nordic countries.

Haaga-Helia's Student Union that takes care of student advocacy and social and study-related interests is called Helga.

Fields of education and degree programmes 

Haaga-Helia offers 27 degree programmes (in 2022), of which 16 lead towards bachelor's degree and 11 towards master's degree. Twelve degree programmes are conducted fully in English.

Bachelor degree programmes in English 
Bachelor of Business Administration:

 Degree programme in Aviation Business, Porvoo campus
 Degree programme in Business Information Technology, Pasila campus
 Degree programme in Digital Business Innovations, Porvoo campus
 Degree programme in International Business, Pasila campus

Bachelor of Hospitality Management:

 Degree programme in Sustainable Tourism and Event Management, Porvoo campus
 Degree programme in Hospitality and Tourism Experience Management, Haaga campus

Bachelor of Sports:

 Degree programme in Sports Coaching and Management, Vierumäki campus

Master degree programmes in English 
Master of Business Administration:

 Degree programme in Business Technologies, Pasila campus
 Degree programme in Leading Business Transformation, Pasila campus
 Degree programme in Strategising in Organisations, Virtual studies
 Degree programme in Sustainable Aviation Business, Virtual studies

Master of Hospitality Management:

 Degree programme in Tourism and Hospitality Business, Pasila campus

School of Vocational Teacher Education 

 Vocational Teacher Education Programme, Pasila campus

Organisation
Haaga-Helia's president and CEO is Minna Hiillos, vice-presidents are Katja Komulainen (Teaching and Learning), Salla Huttunen (Competences, RDI and Digitalisation) and Jouni Ahonen (Commercial and International Services).

Campuses 
Haaga-Helia operates on five campuses: Pasila, Malmi, Haaga (all in Helsinki), Porvoo and Vierumäki.

Board 
The Board governs and oversees Haaga-Helia's operations. Chairman of the board is Deputy CEO Jorma Rauhala. Other members of the board: Principal Lecturer Minna-Maari Harmaala, Manager Mirja Heiskari, CEO Tauno Jalonen, Development Director Björn Keto, Director Markku Lahtinen, Development Manager Kai Laikio (1. Deputy Chairman of the board), Student Iida Tervo, CEO Timo Lappi (2. Deputy Chairman of the board), CEO of Haaga-Helia University of Applied Sciences Minna Hiillos, Director of Finance Virpi Peltoniemi (Board Secretary).

History 
Haaga-Helia University of Applied Sciences was established in the beginning of 2007, when Helsinki Business Polytechnic (Helia) and Haaga Institute Polytechnic merged and created a new university of applied sciences. At the time, there were approximately 6000 students in Helia and approximately 4000 students in Haaga Institute.

See also
 Ammattikorkeakoulu

References

Education in Helsinki
Science and technology in Finland